The 2010 season was the Arizona Cardinals' 91st in the National Football League (NFL) and their 23rd in Arizona. The Cardinals failed to improve on their 10–6 record from 2009, and were eliminated from postseason contention for the first time since 2007 in Week 15.

Offseason
Quarterback Kurt Warner announced his retirement on January 29, 2010.

2010 NFL Draft

After finishing the season with a loss in the divisional round of the postseason, the Cardinals will pick 26th.  The Cardinals will also have an additional third and fourth round pick from a trade that sent wide receiver Anquan Boldin to the Baltimore Ravens.  Their fourth round pick was traded to the New York Jets for safety Kerry Rhodes.

Staff and roster

Coaching staff

Final roster

Preseason

Schedule

Regular season

Standings

Regular season results

Week 1: at St. Louis Rams

The Cardinals began their season at the Edward Jones Dome for an NFC West match against the St. Louis Rams. The Cardinals scored first in the 2nd quarter with kicker Jay Feely nailing a 22-yard field goal, which was replied by St. Louis when kicker Josh Brown made a 46-yard field goal. Arizona took the lead again with running back Tim Hightower making a 1-yard TD run, but failed to maintain it, with quarterback Sam Bradford making a 1-yard TD pass to wide receiver Laurent Robinson. In the third quarter, the Cardinals trailed for the first time when Brown nailed a 25-yard field goal, which they overcame in the fourth quarter when quarterback Derek Anderson made a 21-yard touchdown pass to wide receiver Larry Fitzgerald, giving Arizona a win.

With the win, Arizona began the season at 1–0.

Week 2: at Atlanta Falcons

Hoping to maintain their current winning streak the Cardinals flew to Georgia Dome for an NFC duel with the Falcons. In the first quarter Arizona trailed early as QB Matt Ryan completed a 7-yard TD pass to WR Roddy White, followed in the second quarter by kicker Matt Bryant hitting a 24-yard field goal. Arizona would reply with RB Tim Hightower getting an 80-yard TD run, but fell further behind when Ryan threw a 19-yard TD pass to FB Jason Snelling, followed by Snelling getting a 1-yard TD run. In the third quarter the Cardinals struggled further when Ryan completed a 12-yard touchdown pass to WR Brian Finneran, followed by Bryan nailing a 35-yard field goal. In the fourth quarter Arizona continued to struggle with FB Jason Snelling getting a 7-yard TD run.

With the loss, the Cardinals fell to 1–1.

Week 3: vs. Oakland Raiders

The Cardinals' third game was an Interconference duel with the Raiders. The Cardinals led early in the first quarter when RB LaRod Stephens-Howling returned a kickoff from his own goal line to the endzone running 102 yards for a touchdown. The Raiders replied and took the lead with QB Bruce Gradkowski completing a 22-yard touchdown pass to TE Zach Miller, followed by kicker Sebastian Janikowski making a 22-yard field goal. Arizona replied with kicker Jay Feely kicking a 42-yard field goal. Then the Raiders replied with Janikowski making a 54-yard field goal. The Cardinals took the lead in the 2nd quarter when QB Derek Anderson made a 2-yard TD pass to WR Steve Breaston, but it didn't last very long after RB Darren McFadden got a 2-yard TD run. Arizona got the lead back in the 3rd quarter when Anderson found WR Larry Fitzgerald on an 8-yard TD pass. In the 4th quarter Oakland cut the lead when Janikowski made a 23-yard field goal. Janikowski missed three field goals in the game, giving Arizona the win.

With the close win, Arizona improved to 2–1.

Week 4: at San Diego Chargers

Hoping to increase their winning streak the Cardinals flew to Qualcomm Stadium for an interconference duel with the Chargers. In the 1st quarter the Cardinals trailed early as QB Philip Rivers completed a 33-yard TD pass to TE Antonio Gates, but they replied in the 2nd quarter when FS Kerry Rhodes recovered a fumble and ran 2 yards to the endzone for a touchdown. After that, the Cardinals fell further behind with FB Mike Tolbert making a 5-yard TD run, followed by Rivers making a 26-yard TD pass to TE Antonio Gates. The Cardinals had more problems when QB Derek Anderson's pass was intercepted by OLB Shaun Phillips which converted into a 31-yard touchdown run. This was followed in the 3rd quarter by kicker Nate Kaeding making a 48-yard field goal. Then RB Ryan Mathews got a 15-yard TD run. This was followed in the 4th quarter by Kaeding nailing a 47-yard field goal. The Cardinals tried to cut the lead, but only came away with kicker Jay Feely's 53-yard field goal, which isn't enough for the win.

With the loss, Arizona fell to 2–2.

Week 5: vs. New Orleans Saints

Hoping to rebound from their loss to the Chargers the Cardinals played on home ground for an NFC duel with the Saints. In the first quarter the Cardinals trailed early as kicker John Carney nailed a 31-yard field goal, followed by QB Drew Brees completing a 1-yard TD pass to TE Jeremy Shockey. The Cardinals replied with kicker Jay Feely making a 37-yard field goal, followed by OT Levi Brown recovering a fumble and returning it 2 yards for a touchdown. In the third quarter the Cardinals replied and took the lead when Feely got a 44-yard field goal, followed the 4th quarter by Feely's 29-yard field goal. Then FS Kerry Rhodes recovered a fumble and ran 27 yards to the endzone for a touchdown. The lead was broken down with Brees making a 35-yard TD pass to WR Robert Meachem, but the Cardinals managed to pull away when Brees' pass was intercepted by CB Dominique Rodgers-Cromartie and returned 28 yards to the endzone for a touchdown.

With the win, Arizona went into their bye week at 3–2.

Week 7: at Seattle Seahawks

Coming off their bye week the Cardinals flew to Qwest Field for an NFC West rivalry match against the Seahawks. In the first quarter the Cardinals trailed early as kicker Olindo Mare got a 20-yard field goal. Followed in the second quarter by QB Matt Hasselbeck making a 2-yard TD pass to WR Mike Williams. The Cardinals fell further behind in the 3rd quarter with Mare nailing a 31 and a 51-yard field goal. The Cardinals replied with RB Beanie Wells getting a 2-yard TD run. The Seahawks continued to score with Mare hitting a 24-yard field goal, but the Cardinals responded in the fourth quarter with kicker Jay Feely getting a 24-yard field goal. The Seahawks pulled away with Mare making a 26-yard field goal.

With the loss, the Cardinals fell to 3–3.

Week 8: vs. Tampa Bay Buccaneers
{{Americanfootballbox
 |titlestyle=background:#000000; color:white; border:2px solid #97233F;text-align:center;
 |state=autocollapse
 |title=Week 8: Tampa Bay Buccaneers at Arizona Cardinals – Game summary
 |date=October 31
 |time=4:15 pm. EDT
 |road=Buccaneers
 |R1=7 |R2=17 |R3=7 |R4=7
 |home=Cardinals
 |H1=7 |H2=7 |H3=14 |H4=7
 |stadium=University of Phoenix Stadium, Glendale, Arizona
 |attendance=61,857
 |weather=None (retractable roof closed)
 |referee=Ron Winter
 |TV=Fox
 |TVAnnouncers= Chris Myers, Brian Billick and Jaime Maggio
 |reference=Recap
 |scoring=
First quarter
 ARI – Larry Fitzgerald 3-yard pass from Max Hall (Jay Feely kick), Cardinals 7–0, Drive: 9 plays, 61 yards, 4:38.
 TB – Gerald Hayes 41-yard interception return (Connor Barth kick), Tied 7–7.
Second quarter
 ARI – Beanie Wells 1-yard run (Jay Feely kick), Cardinals 14–7, Drive: 4 plays, 16 yards, 2:03.
 TB – Mike Williams 47-yard pass from Josh Freeman (Connor Barth kick), Tied 14–14, Drive: 3 plays, 80 yards, 1:18.
 TB – Aqib Talib 45-yard interception return (Connor Barth kick), 'Buccaneers 21–14.
 TB – Connor Barth 21-yard field goal, Buccaneers 24–14, Drive: 12 plays, 94 yards, 3:15.Third quarter TB – LeGarrette Blount 15-yard run (Connor Barth kick), Buccaneers 31–14, Drive: 8 plays, 80 yards, 4:47. ARI – LaRod Stephens-Howling 30-yard run (Jay Feely kick), Buccaneers 31–21, Drive: 7 plays, 76 yards, 3:39. ARI – Gerald Hayes 21-yard fumble return (Jay Feely kick), Buccaneers 31–28.Fourth quarter ARI – Larry Fitzgerald 5-yard pass from Derek Anderson (Connor Barth kick), Cardinals 35–31, Drive: 4 plays, 48 yards, 4:38. TB – LeGarrette Blount 1-yard run (Connor Barth kick), Buccaneers 38–35, Drive: 7 plays, 74 yards, 4:28. |stats=Top passers TB – Josh Freeman – 18/25, 278 yards, 1 touchdown
 ARI – Derek Anderson – 16/24, 234 yards, 1 touchdown, 2 interceptionsTop rushers TB – LeGarrette Blount – 22 rushes, 120 yards, 2 touchdowns
 ARI – Beanie Wells – 16 rushes, 50 yards, 1 touchdownTop receivers TB – Mike Williams – 4 receptions, 105 yards, 1 touchdown
 ARI – Steve Breaston – 8 receptions, 147 yardsTop tacklers'''
 TB – Cody Grimm – 4 tackles, 4 assists
 ARI – Kerry Rhodes – 9 tackles, 1 assist
}}
The Cardinals' seventh game was an NFC duel with the Buccaneers at University of Phoenix Stadium. In the first quarter the Cardinals took the lead when QB Max Hall made a 3-yard TD pass to WR Larry Fitzgerald. The Buccaneers replied with OLB Geno Hayes returning an interception 41 yards for a touchdown. The Cardinals led again in the second quarter with RB Beanie Wells getting a 1-yard TD run, but the Buccaneers went on a scoring rally with QB Josh Freeman making a 47-yard TD pass to WR Mike Williams, and CB Aqib Talib returning an interception 45 yards for a touchdown. This was followed by kicker Connor Barth hitting a 21-yard field goal, and in the third quarter with RB LeGarrette Blount getting a 15-yard TD run. The Cardinals also went on a rally to take the lead back with RB LaRod Stephens-Howling making a 30-yard TD run, which was followed by ILB Gerald Hayes recovering a fumble and running 21 yards to the endzone for a touchdown. Then QB Derek Anderson found Fitzgerald on a 5-yard TD pass. The Buccaneers scored once more to take the win with Blount getting a 1-yard TD run.

With the loss, Arizona recorded back to back losses for the first time since the 2008 season, and fell to 3–4.

Week 9: at Minnesota Vikings

Hoping to snap their current losing streak the Cardinals flew to Hubert H. Humphrey Metrodome for an NFC duel with the Vikings. In the second quarter the Cardinals trailed early as QB Brett Favre got a 12-yard TD pass to RB Adrian Peterson. They immediately replied with a 96-yard kickoff return for a touchdown by RB LaRod Stephens-Howling. The Vikings responded with kicker Ryan Longwell nailing a 21-yard field goal. The Cardinals replied a took the lead with QB Derek Anderson completing a 30-yard TD pass to WR Andre Roberts. This was followed by DB Michael Adams returning a fumble 30 yards for a touchdown, and with kicker Jay Feely making a 22-yard field goal. The lead was closed down by Peterson as he got a 4-yard TD run, and by QB Brett Favre's 25-yard TD pass to TE Visanthe Shiancoe. After overtime the decision was made when Longwell successfully made a 35-yard field goal to give the Cardinals a loss, bringing their record down to 3–5.

Week 10: vs. Seattle Seahawks

The Cardinals' ninth game was an NFC West rivalry re-match against the Seahawks. In the first quarter the Cardinals took the early lead as RB Tim Hightower got a 2-yard TD run. The Seahawks replied with RB Marshawn Lynch getting a 1-yard TD run. The Cardinals trailed with kicker Olindo Mare getting a 41-yard field goal, but they answed back with kicker Jay Feely nailing a 23-yard field goal. The Cardinals struggled further with QB Matt Hasselbeck completing a 63-yard TD pass to WR Deon Butler. This was followed in the third quarter by a 34, 19 and 23-yard field goal from Mare. In the fourth quarter Mare got another 19-yard field goal to put the Seahawks up 29–10. The Cardinals responded with QB Derek Anderson making a 2-yard TD pass to WR Early Doucet (With a successful 2-point conversion as Anderson found WR Larry Fitzgerald), but the Seahawks put the game away with RB Justin Forsett getting a 4-yard TD run.

With the loss, Arizona fell to 3–6.

Week 11: at Kansas City Chiefs
Hoping to break their current losing streak the Cardinals flew to Arrowhead Stadium for an interconference duel with the Chiefs. The Cardinals scored with kicker Jay Feely hitting a 36-yard field goal, but they fell behind with QB Matt Cassel completing a 1-yard TD pass to WR Dwayne Bowe. This was followed by RB Thomas Jones getting a 1 and a 3-yard TD run. The Cardinals responded with Feely making a 29-yard field goal, but they struggled further with kicker Ryan Succop getting a 23-yard field goal, followed by Cassel throwing a 38-yard TD pass to Bowe. The Cardinals cut the lead with QB Derek Anderson completing a 3-yard TD pass to WR Larry Fitzgerald.

With the loss, the Cardinals fell to 3–7.

Week 12: vs. San Francisco 49ers

Trying to snap a five-game losing streak, the Cardinals went home, donned their alternate uniforms again, and played a Week 12 NFC West duel with the San Francisco 49ers on Monday night.  Arizona trailed early in the first quarter as 49ers quarterback Troy Smith completed a 38-yard touchdown pass to wide receiver Michael Crabtree.  The Cardinals answered with a 31-yard field goal from kicker Jay Feely, but San Francisco struck back with running back Anthony Dixon getting a 1-yard touchdown run.  The 49ers added onto their lead in the second quarter with running back Brian Westbrook getting an 8-yard touchdown run.  Arizona would respond with Feely's 39-yard field goal.  From there, San Francisco pulled away in the third quarter as 49ers kicker Shane Andrus made a 38-yard field goal, followed by his 26-yard field goal in the fourth quarter.

With the loss, the Cardinals fell to 3–8.

Week 13: vs. St. Louis Rams

Hoping to break a six-game losing streak the Cardinals played on home ground for a division rivalry match against the Rams. The Cardinals took the early lead as kicker Jay Feely got a 45 and a 41-yard field goal. They soon trailed after kicker Josh Brown hit a 28, 52 and 20-yard field goal. This was followed in the third quarter by RB Steven Jackson getting a 27-yard TD run, and with Brown making a 43-yard field goal.

With the loss, the Cardinals fell to 3–9.

Week 14: vs. Denver Broncos

The Cardinals thirteenth game was an interconference duel with the Broncos. The Cardinals trailed early as Broncos kicker Steven Hauschka nailed a 32-yard field goal, but rallied to take the lead with kicker Jay Feely making a 36 and a 48-yard field goal, followed by his 5-yard TD run to the endzone, then he made a 55, 23 and a 49-yard field goal to put the Cardinals up 22–3. The lead was narrowed slightly as Hauchka got a 30-yard field goal, but the Cardinals increased their lead with RB Tim Hightower getting an 8-yard TD run. The Broncos tried to break down the lead as RB Knowshon Moreno got a 1-yard TD run, but the Cardinals pulled away with Hightower getting a 35-yard TD run, followed by DE Darnell Dockett recovering a fumble in the endzone for a touchdown.

With the win, Arizona improved to 4–9, and got their first-ever win over the Broncos in the franchise's history, though they tied in 1973 and never played the Broncos between 1978 and 1988. Despite losing nine games on the year, the Cardinals are still playoff-eligible in the very weak NFC West.

Week 15: at Carolina Panthers

Coming off their win over the Broncos the Cardinals flew to Bank of America Stadium for an NFC duel with the Panthers. In the first quarter the Cardinals trailed early as kicker John Kasay hit a 28 and a 29-yard field goal. This was followed in the second quarter by QB Jimmy Clausen completing a 16-yard touchdown pass to TE Jeff King. The Cardinals answered with kicker Jay Feely nailing a 23-yard field goal, but struggled further after Kasay made a 24 and a 43-yard field goal. The Cardinals tried to come back with Steve Breaston recovering a fumble in the end zone for a touchdown (With a failed two-point conversion) and then with Feely getting a 30-yard field goal, but the Panthers' defense was enough to secure themselves the win.

With the loss, Arizona fell to 4–10, and was officially ousted from the postseason for the first time since 2007.

Week 16: vs. Dallas Cowboys

This game marked the second time the Cardinals hosted the Cowboys on Christmas Day, after a 1995 Monday Night Football'' contest.

Week 17: at San Francisco 49ers

The Cardinals' final game was an NFC West rivalry rematch against the 49ers. The Cardinals trailed early as QB Alex Smith completed a 37-yard TD pass to WR Ted Ginn Jr., followed in the 2nd quarter by kicker Jeff Reed making a 39-yard field goal. The Cardinals narrowed the lead as QB John Skelton completed a 10-yard TD pass to WR Larry Fitzgerald, but fell further behind after Smith completed a 59-yard TD pass to TE Vernon Davis, followed by RB Brian Westbrook running 6 yards to the endzone for a touchdown twice in succession. Arizona's offense continued to have problems as Richard Bartel's pass was intercepted by CB Tarell Brown and returned 62 yards for a touchdown.

With the loss, the Cardinals finish with a 5–11 record.

Notes and references

Arizona
Arizona Cardinals seasons
Arizona